Oscar Rauch (1907 – 1991) was a Swiss footballer who played for Switzerland in the 1938 FIFA World Cup. He also played for Grasshopper Club Zürich. He won 2 Swiss league titles in a successful career there.

References

Swiss men's footballers
Switzerland international footballers
1938 FIFA World Cup players
Association football midfielders
Grasshopper Club Zürich players
1907 births
1991 deaths